Harry N. Ockerman (December 20, 1902 – September 30, 1979) was American football, basketball, and baseball player and coach. He served as the head football coach at Bowling Green State University from 1935 to 1940 and at Michigan State Normal College—now known as Eastern Michigan University—from 1949 to 1951, compiling a career college football record of 27–38–9. Ockerman was also the head basketball coach at Michigan State Normal from 1932 to 1935, tallying a mark of 34–16, and the head baseball coach at the school in 1929 and from 1932 to 1934, amassing a record of 18–12.

Head coach

Michigan State Normal football
In 1951, Ockerman's second, and final, year coaching the MSNC Hurons, the press reported rumors that the football players had been "doped" with novocain to allow them to play through injuries. Joseph McCulloch, in his fourth decade as MSNC's athletic director, denied the allegation, telling reporters, "We want to know who started these rumors."

Late life and death
After retiring from coaching, Ockerman owned and operated a calendar and specialty advertising business in Baltimore. He died on September 30, 1979, at Boswell Hospital in Sun City, Arizona.

Head coaching record

Football

Basketball

References

External links
 

1902 births
1979 deaths
American advertising executives
American men's basketball players
Bowling Green Falcons athletic directors
Bowling Green Falcons football coaches
Eastern Michigan Eagles baseball coaches
Eastern Michigan Eagles baseball players
Eastern Michigan Eagles football coaches
Eastern Michigan Eagles football players
Eastern Michigan Eagles men's basketball coaches
Eastern Michigan Eagles men's basketball players
People from Gladwin, Michigan
People from Sun City, Arizona
Coaches of American football from Michigan
Players of American football from Michigan
Baseball coaches from Michigan
Baseball players from Michigan
Basketball coaches from Michigan
Basketball players from Michigan
Businesspeople from Baltimore